An adel or adoul is a type of public official in Morocco. Adels act in pairs to record marriages. They may also draft contracts, prenuptial agreements, divorce settlements and adjudicate testaments. Their office is comparable to that of a civil law notary. Women were first allowed to become adels in 2018.

See also 

 https://fr.wikipedia.org/wiki/Mariage_musulman_marocain

References

Region-specific legal occupations
Law of Morocco